Sturgeon Point State Park is an undeveloped public recreation area that is home to the historic Sturgeon Point Light. In addition to the lighthouse and associated museum, the park features a long and shallow reef that juts into Lake Huron and extends for almost a full mile. The park is used for lighthouse visits, swimming, and viewing various Michigan flora and fauna.

References

External links
Sturgeon Point State Park Michigan Department of Natural Resources
Sturgeon Point State Park Map Michigan Department of Natural Resources

State parks of Michigan
Protected areas of Alcona County, Michigan
Protected areas established in 1960
1960 establishments in Michigan
Landforms of Alcona County, Michigan
IUCN Category III
Lake Huron